Women as theological figures have played a significant role in the development of various religions and religious hierarchies.

Throughout most of history women were unofficial theologians.  They would write and teach, but did not hold official positions in Universities and Seminaries. Beginning in the second half of the twentieth century, women theological scholars began to be appointed to formal faculty positions at theological schools. Women are slowly being recognized as theological scholars.

George Gallup Jr. wrote in 2002 that studies show women have more religiosity than men. Gallup goes on to say that women hold on to their faith more heartily, work harder for the church, and in general practice with more consistency than men.

Women theological scholars
Catherine L. Albanese, American religious studies scholar, professor, lecturer, and author
Karen Armstrong, British author known for her books on comparative religion
Marta Benavides, El Salvadorian feminist religious leader
Katie Cannon, American Christian theologian and ethicist associated with womanist theology and black theology
Monica Coleman, theologian associated with process theology and womanist theology
M. Shawn Copeland, American womanist and Black Catholic theologian
Kelly Brown Douglas, African-American Episcopal priest, womanist theologian, and academic
Elisabeth Schüssler Fiorenza, Romanian-born German Roman Catholic feminist theologian
Wilda C. Gafney, American biblical scholar and Episcopal priest
Jacquelyn Grant, American theologian and Methodist minister who is one of the founding developers of womanist theology
Nyasha Junior, American biblical scholar focusing on the connections between religion, race, and gender within the Hebrew Bible
Joanna Macy, environmental activist, author, and scholar of Buddhism
Sallie McFague, American feminist theologian, who emphasized God as mother in her theology
Mercy Amba Oduyoye, Ghanaian theologian and founder of the Circle of Concerned African Women Theologians
Muriel Orevillo-Montenegro, Filipina theologian known for her writings in Asian feminist theology
Jamie T. Phelps, American Catholic theologian known for her contributions to womanist theology
Elizabeth Schrader Polczer, American biblical scholar who concentrates on textual studies concerning Mary Magdalene, the Gospel of John, and the Nag Hammadi corpus
Rosemary Radford Reuther, American feminist theologian who helped define fields of Christian feminist and eco-feminist theology
Letty M. Russell, American Christian feminist theologian who pioneered feminist ecclesiology
Joan E. Taylor, English historian of the Bible and early Christianity with special expertise in archaeology, and women's and gender studies.
Emilie Townes, American Christian social ethicist and theologian
Renita J. Weems, ordained minister, a Hebrew Bible scholar, and an author
Delores S. Williams, American Presbyterian theologian notable for her formative role in the development of womanist theology
Traci D. Blackmon, minister and spiritual leader involved in peaceful protests during unrest in Ferguson, Missouri in 2014

Baháʼí Faith 

In writings of the Baháʼí Faith, the Holy Spirit is often described as the "Maid of Heaven".

Three women figure prominently in the history of the Baháʼí Faith: Táhirih, a disciple of the Báb; Ásíyih Khánum, the wife of Baháʼu'lláh; and Bahíyyih Khánum the daughter of Baháʼu'lláh. Táhirih and Bahíyyih, in particular, held strong leadership positions and are seen vital to the development of the religion.

Several women played leading roles in the early days of the Baháʼí Faith in America. Among them are: May Maxwell, Corinne True, and Martha Root. Rúhíyyih Khanum and a mix of male and female Hands of the Cause formed an interim leadership of the religion for six years prior to the formation of the Universal House of Justice. Later prominent women include Patricia Locke, Jaqueline Left Hand Bull Delahunt, Layli Miller-Muro, and Dr. Susan Maneck, who herself wrote books documenting the role of women in the Baháʼí Faith.

Buddhism 

Khema and Uppalavanna, the two chief female disciples of the Buddha
Kisa Gotami
Machig Labdrön, founder of the Tibetan practice of Chöd
Maha Pajapati Gotami
Pema Chodron, fully ordained Buddhist nun in the Tibetan Shambhala lineage.
Ani Tenzin Palmo, nun in the Drukpa Kagyu lineage and founder of Dongyu Gatsal Ling Nunnery in Himachal Pradesh, India
Yeshe Tsogyal, Tibetan consort and disciple of the Padmasambhava
Chandra Khonnokyoong, a Thai mae chi (nun) and meditation teacher

Christianity

In the New Testament
Mary, mother of Jesus
Mary Magdalene, one of Jesus' closest followers
Lydia and Phoebe
Mary of Bethany, sister of Lazarus and disciple of Jesus (sometimes misidentified with Mary Magdalene)
Priscilla, teacher with her husband Aquila, partner with Apostle Paul
Junia, female apostle of New Testament

In the Early Christian Church
Perpetua and Felicity, martyrs
Monica of Hippo
Macrina the Younger
Radegund (520–587), Frankish queen, ordained as a deaconess, established a convent
Clotilde
Hilda of Whitby, royal abbess in the 7th century
Irene of Athens (c. 752–803), Empress who convened the 7th ecumenical council
Kassia, 9th-century Eastern Orthodox nun, poet and hymnographer; sometimes referred to as St. Kassiani

In the Medieval church
Antoinette Bourignon, a mystic
Bridget of Sweden (1302–1373)
Heloise (student of Abelard)
Hildegard of Bingen, theologian, mystic, wrote much music, some which has survived
Pope Joan, although existence has been questioned
Margery Kempe (c.1373–1438)
Macrina the Younger, sister and influence upon Basil the Great and Gregory of Nyssa
Clare of Assisi, founded the Poor Clares
Julian of Norwich (1342–c.1416), a mystic
Scholastica, twin sister of Benedict of Nursia

In the Catholic Church (Post-Reformation)

Mme Guyon, influential in Quietism
Mother Cabrini, missionary to New York and first canonized US citizen
Mother Teresa, founder of the Missionaries of Charity in India
Elizabeth Ann Seton, founded the Sisters of Charity
Faustina Kowalska, promoted devotion to Divine Mercy
Katharine Drexel, founded the Sisters of the Blessed Sacrament, which performed charitable works for Native Americans and African Americans
Rose Philippine Duchesne, co-founder of the Society of the Sacred Heart

In 1970 three women were declared Doctor of the Church 
Catherine of Siena
Teresa of Avila
Thérèse of Lisieux

In Protestant churches
Ursula Cotta (article in German) (c. 1450–1511), influenced Luther's attitude toward women 
Inger Ottesdotter Rømer (c. 1475–1555), wealthiest landowner in Norway, promoted the Reformation extensively
Argula von Grumbach (1492-1554), writer who defended Martin Luther
Christina Gyllenstierna (1494-1559), commanded the city of Stockholm, unsuccessful in preventing the execution of over 100 people for heresy (Stockholm Bloodbath)
Katharina Zell (1497 or 1498–1562), proponent of clerical marriage
Katharina von Bora, (1499–1552) Roman Catholic nun who became Lutheran, proponent of clerical marriage
Ursula of Munsterberg in 1528 published 69 articles about why she and other nuns were going to leave their convent.
Anne Boleyn, influenced religious development in England indirectly by leading Henry VIII to divorce Catherine of Aragon and break from the Catholic Church
Elisabeth of Hesse (1502–1557), exposed secret bigamy of her brother Philip
Elisabeth of Brandenburg (1510-1558), secretly took communion in both kinds against the wishes of her Catholic father. She implemented the Reformation when governing in place of her underage son
Amalia of Cleves (1517-1586), authored a songbook, rejected as possible wife by Henry VIII
Anne Askew (1521–1546), tortured in the Tower of London and martyred in Smithfield for Protestantism
Joan Bocher (?–1550), English Anabaptist martyr in Smithfield
Elizabeth Pepper (?–1556), martyred while pregnant for Protestantism, together with Agnes George
Guernsey Martyrs, three women martyred for Protestantism in 1556, one woman was pregnant and gave birth while being burned, the child was rescued but then ordered to be burned too
Anne Locke (1530 – ?), Calvinist poet
Anna Leuhusen (died c. 1554), abbess who along with her nuns, became nurses
Joan Waste (1534–1556), blind woman martyred for Protestantism 
Alice Benden (?–1557), martyred for Protestantism
Alice Driver (?–1558), testified for and martyred for Protestantism
Anna Maria of the Palatinate (1561 – 1589), a Lutheran who was concerned about the spread of Calvinism and described by Charles IX of Sweden as "more educated in religion than anyone to be found."
Magdalena Heymair, in 1569 became the first woman to have her writings listed on the Index Librorum Prohibitorum
Elizabeth Melville (c.1578–c.1640), Scottish Calvinist poet, first known woman to print a book in Scotland.
Augusta of Denmark (1580 – 1639), walked to Lutheran church and refused to attend Calvinist services. Later fired a Calvinist minister and restored the previous Lutheran minister to his position.
Anna Maria von Eggenberg (1609-1680), moved court to a city in Hungary where she would be able sponsor Protestant church services.
Catherine Vasa of Sweden (1539-1610) actively supported Lutheranism above Calvinism, visited Wittenberg to study theology, wrote interpretations of the bible
Johanna Eleonora Petersen (1644-1724), Pietist writer, wikilink in German
Anne Hutchinson, charismatic and outspoken Puritan in early colonial New England whose unorthodox religious views helped spark the Antinomian Controversy from 1636 to 1638
Johanna Sibylla Küsel  (1650 – 1717), Lutheran printmaker who illustrated religious and scientific books.
Mary Dyer, avid follower of the Quaker religion who became a martyr when she was hanged in Boston in 1660 for her religious activism
Katharina Elizabeth – in 1698, Catholic village leaders of Radibor attempted to have her disciplined for attempted Lutheranization of the population.
Marie Durand (1711–1776), imprisoned 38 years in the Tower of Constance for Protestantism with 24 other women
Barbara von Krüdener (1764–1824), her spiritual relationship with Tsar Alexander influenced the religious character of the Holy Alliance, for a time she gave up her noble lifestyle and wandered, supporting crowds who wandered with her.
Amalie Sieveking (1794 –1859), founded society which trained women to help for poor and invalids, wrote tracts
Clara Maass (1876–1901), devout nurse who died after volunteering in an immunization experiment, listed on the Lutheran Calendar of Saints
Ellen G. White (1827-1915), co-founder and prophetess of the Seventh-day Adventist Church, a large Protestant movement present in over 200 countries and territories.
Lottie Moon (1840–1912), Baptist missionary to China
Mary Hannah Fulton (1854–1927), Presbyterian missionary to China
Eva von Tiele-Winckler (1866-1930), (article in German), deaconess
Elisabeth Schmitz (1893-1977), unsuccessfully attempted to prod the Confessing Church to take a stance in favor of Jews during the Nazi era. 
Gertrud Staewen (1894-1987), supported the cause of Jews in the Confessing Church during the Nazi era. Wikilink in German.
Betty Stam (1906–1934), missionary to China, martyr
Rachel Saint (1914–1994), missionary to the Huaorani in Operation Auca after the martyrdom of her brother

In Eastern Orthodoxy
 Catherine the Great, Russian Orthodox from 1744 to 1796, had been Lutheran from 1729 to 1744, nationalised all church lands, issued 1773 "Toleration of All Faiths" edict
 Matrona Nikonova
 Euphrosyne of Polotsk
 Olga of Kiev
 Xenia of Saint Petersburg
 Fevronia, described in The Tale of Peter and Fevronia
 Anna of Kashin
 Juliana of Lazarevo
 Princess Elisabeth of Hesse and by Rhine
 Barbara Skvorchikhinskaya (article in Russian)
 Eudoxia of Moscow
 Juliana, Princess of Vyazma (article in Russian)
 Frederica Mathewes-Green, (b. 1952) wife of priest and theological speaker

In the Latter Day Saint movement

 Emma Smith first wife of Joseph Smith and first General President of the Relief Society
 Inez Knight Allen one of the first single women to be a missionary in the Church of Jesus Christ of Latter-day Saints
 Eliza R. Snow second president of the Relief Society and renowned poet
 Amanda Barnes Smith helped organize the Relief Society and Sunday School in Salt Lake City
 Mary Elizabeth Rollins Lightner saved papers of the Book of Commandments from a mob, later published as the Doctrine & Covenants
 Sariah wife of Lehi and mother of Nephi in the Book of Mormon

Hymnodists
A number of hymns and psalms have been written by women, from the pen of Fanny Crosby and Emily Gosse, for example.

Elisabeth Cruciger (1500-1535), the first female Protestant hymn writer
Louise Henriette of Nassau (1627–1667), Calvinist hymnwriter, wrote "".
Emilie Juliane of Barby-Mühlingen (1637–1706), Lutheran hymnwriter, wrote nearly 600 hymns, including "Wer weiß, wie nahe mir mein Ende," which has been translated into English as "Who Knows When Death May Overtake Me."
 Anna Sophia II (1638–1683), wrote "Rede, liebster Jesu, rede," which was translated as "Speak, O Lord, Thy Servant Heareth."
 Ludmilla Elisabeth (1640–1672), her hymn "Jesus, Jesus, nichts als Jesu" was translated as "Jesus, Jesus, Only Jesus".
Anna Laetitia Barbauld (1743–1825), authored Hymns in Prose for Children
Aimee Semple McPherson ("Sister Aimee"), early 20th-century evangelist and founder of the Foursquare Church
Jane Wardley, contributed to the development of the Shakers
Catherine Booth, co-founder of the Salvation Army
Elizabeth Fry, Quaker and prison reformer
 Princess Eugénie (1830–1889), her hymn "O, at jeg kunde min Jesus prise" is set to a Norwegian folk tune and was translated as "My heart is longing."
 Lina Sandell (1832–1903), Swedish hymn writer, wrote Tryggare kan ingen vara
Ellen G. White, co-founder and prophetess of the Seventh-day Adventist Church
Evangeline Booth, fourth General of the Salvation Army
Elizabeth Barrett Browning (1806–1861), English hymn writer and literary figure
Hannah Whitall Smith, prominent leader in the Holiness movement
Joanna Southcott,  18th-century self-described religious prophetess and founder of Southcottians
Li Tim-Oi, first female priest to be ordained in the Anglican Communion
Louisa Maria Hubbard (1836–1906), involved in the deaconess movement; published in 1871 the pamphlet "Anglican Deaconesses: is there No Place for Women in the System?"
Mother Ann Lee, leader of the Shakers in America
Phoebe Palmer, prominent leader in the Holiness movement
Selina, Countess of Huntingdon, involved with Methodism; there was a group called the Countess of Huntingdon's Connection
Mary Baker Eddy, founded Christian Science
 Jackie Pullinger MBE, contemporary missionary working with inner city gangs, and founder of St Stephen's Society in Hong Kong
 Florence Crawford ("Mother Crawford"), founder of the Apostolic Faith Mission of Portland, Oregon
 Catherine Winkworth (1827–1878), Translator of German chorales
 Eliza Sibbald Alderson, English poet and hymn writer
 Augusta Amherst Austen, British organist and composer
 Sarah Bache, English hymn writer
 Charlotte Alington Barnard, English poet and composer
 Sarah Doudney, English fiction writer and poet
 Charlotte Elliott, English poet, hymn writer, and editor
 Ada R. Habershon, English Christian hymnist
 Katherine Hankey, English missionary and nurse who is best known for being the author of the poem The Old, Old Story
 Frances Ridley Havergal, English religious poet and hymnwriter
 Maria Grace Saffery, English Baptist poet and hymn-writer
 Anne Steele, English Baptist hymn writer and essayist
 Emily Taylor, English schoolmistress, poet, children's writer, and hymnist
 Emily H. Woodmansee, English-born American Mormon poet and hymnwriter
 Anna White, Shaker Eldress, social reformer, author, and hymn writer

Hinduism 

Recognition of the feminine aspect of God during the last century by Tantric and Shakti religious leaders, has led to the legitimization of the female teachers and female gurus in Hinduism. A notable example was Ramakrishna, who worshiped his wife as the embodiment of the divine feminine. 

Andal
Meerabai
Akka Mahadevi
Lal Ded
Avvaiyar
Karaikkal Ammaiyar
Kanhopatra
Sakhubai
Janabai
Gangasati
Mata Amritanandamayi
Gurumayi Chidvilasananda, teacher in the lineage of teachers of Siddha Yoga
Mother Meera, referred to as a "female guru" by author Karen Pechilis

Islam 

Aisha bint Talha, scholar
A'isha, wife of Muhammad and the narrator of the largest number of hadith
Maryam, mother of Isa (Jesus)
Amara bin Al-Rahman, exemplary woman juris
Amina bint Wahb, mother of Muhammad
Asma bint Abu Bakr, narrator of Hadith
Asiya, wife of the Pharaoh, Foster mother of Mosa (Moses)
Sara, wife of Prophet Ibrahim (Abraham)
Bilqis, Queen of Sheba
Fatima Zahra, youngest daughter of Muhammad and Khadijah
Fatimah bint Qays, scholar
Khadijah, first convert to Islam, first wife of Muhammad
Nusaibah bint Ka'b al-Ansariyah, warrior
Rabi'a al-'Adawiyya, important figure in the development of Sufism
Sayyida Nafisa, scholar
Sumayyah bint Khabbab, first martyr of Islam, seventh convert to it
Ukhtul Mazni, highly placed scholar of Islamic jurisprudence
Umm Ad Darda, theologian
Umm 'Atiyyah, scholar of Islamic jurisprudence
Umm Salamah, narrator of Hadith
Umm Salim, scholar
Umrah Bint Abdu Rahman, theologian and scholar
Yochebed, mother of Musa (Moses)
Tynnetta Muhammad, theologian of the Nation of Islam

Jainism 
The status of women in Jainism differs between the two main sects, Digambara and Svetambara. Jainism prohibits women from appearing naked; because of this, Digambaras, who consider renunciation of clothes essential to moksha, say that they cannot attain enlightenment in the same life. Svetambaras, who allow sadhus to wear clothes, believe that women can attain moksha. There are more Svetambara sadhvis than sadhus and women have always been influential in the Jain religion.

Mallinath, the 19th Tirthankara; she was female according to Svetambaras (but male according to Digambaras)
Marudevi, mother of Rishabha
Trishala, mother of Mahavira

Judaism 

There are several prominent women in the Tanakh.
Eve, the first woman, mother of all life
Sarah, biblical matriarch, prophetess, and miracle worker
Rebecca, biblical matriarch and miracle worker
Rachel, matriarch of some of the twelve tribes
Leah, beloved of God, matriarch of some of the twelve tribes
Dinah, daughter of Jacob and Leah, who when violated by Shechem, her brothers slayed the people of Shechem in an act of revenge
Miriam, prophetess who the Tanakh describes as having delivered the Israelites from exile in Egypt, alongside Moses and Aaron
Jochebed, mother of Moses and woman of faith
Deborah, Hebrew prophetess, fourth judge of the Israelites
Ruth, proselyte par excellence; better than seven sons
Bathsheba, queen and later queen mother of the United Monarchy of Israel and Judea
Hannah, prophetess
Abigail, prophetess and queen of the United Monarchy of Israel and Judea
Esther, Jewish heroine queen associated with the festival of Purim; she is also listed as one of the Prophets in Judaism
Huldah, the prophetess who validated the scroll found in the Temple (thought by many to be the book of Deuteronomy)
Yael, the heroine who killed Sisera, the Canaanite army commander, in order to deliver the Israelites from the troops of King Jabin
Judith, a Jewish widow who killed an Assyrian general and saved her people from oppression
Salome Alexandra, the last regnant queen of Judea, and the final ruler of Judea to die as the sovereign ruler of an independent kingdom
Athaliah, queen regnant of Judah
Michal, princess of the United Kingdom of Israel and Judah
Rahab, who assisted the Israelites in capturing Ancient Jericho by hiding two men who had been sent to scout the city prior to their attack

Sikhism 

Bibi Bhani
Bibi Nanaki
Mai Bhago
Mata Gujri
Mata Jitoji
Mata Khivi
Mata Sahib Kaur
Mata Sundri

Daoism 

One of the Daoist Eight Immortals, Immortal Woman He, is a woman. Additionally, Sun Bu'er was a famous female Taoist master in the 12th century. Her work "Secret Book on the Inner Elixir (as Transmitted by the Immortal Sun Bu'er)" discussed some of the particularities of female "Inner Elixir" (Neidan) cultivation. Daoist nuns usually have equal status with monks.

Wei Huacun, a founder of the Shangqing School

Other religions 
Ann Lee, Shaker, founder of Shaker movement in America
Annie Besant, Theosophist influential in the Indian Independence Movement
Madame Blavatsky, contributed to the development and promotion of theosophy
Mary Ann MacLean, co-founder and leader of The Process Church of the Final Judgment
Nakayama Miki, founder of Tenrikyo
Nirmala Srivastava, founder and self-proclaimed goddess of Sahaja Yoga

Spiritual mediums 
Helen Schucman, claimed to have scribed A Course in Miracles
Jane Roberts, claimed to have channeled Seth
Judy Z. Knight (born Judith Darlene Hampton), claims to have channeled Ramtha
Alice Auma, of the Holy Spirit Movement

See also 
Feminist theology
Gender and religion
Goddess
Blu Greenberg
Islamic feminism
Jewish feminism
Jewish Orthodox Feminist Alliance
List of female mystics
Nuns
Ordination of women
Sacred prostitution
Vestal Virgin
When God Was a Woman
Women as imams
Women in Christianity
Women in Islam
Women in Judaism

References

Bibliography 
Joan Breton Connelly Portrait of a Priestess: Women and Ritual in Ancient Greece Princeton University Press March 2007
 Silvia Evangelisti Nuns: A History of Convent Life, OUP 2007
 Pechilis, Karen. The Graceful Guru: Hindu Female Gurus in India and the United States 
 Shattuck, Cybelle and Lewis, Nancy D. The Pocket Idiot's Guide to Hinduism (2002). 
http://www.rhul.ac.uk/bedford-centre/history-women-religious/ being the webpage of the History of Women Religious of Britain and Ireland, which has a number of entries on the links page.

External links 

Spots of Light: Women in the Holocaust | Faith from an exhibition by Yad Vashem
Women in Religion section of American Academy of Religion

Religious studies
Women and religion
Religion-related lists